Quellacocha (possibly from Quechua killa moon, month, qucha lake, "moon lake") is a small lake in the Cusco Region in Peru. It is situated in the Urubamba mountain range at a height of about 4,170 metres (13,680 ft). Quellacocha lies south west of the village Lares and north of the mountains Chicón and Sirihuani.

References 

Lakes of Peru
Lakes of Cusco Region